Eros Music (also known as Eros Now Music) is a  music studio and distributor based in Mumbai, India. It is the dependent and domestic music label of Eros International, an Indian film production and distribution company owned by Eros Media World.

History
Eros Music was founded in 2006. It is primarily known for Bollywood music soundtracks and songs. Omkara is the first film whose music and soundtrack was produced by Eros Music.

Film music and soundtracks produced or acquired by Eros Music

Followings are the list of music albums produced by Eros Music.

References

2006 establishments in Maharashtra
Indian music record labels
Mass media companies based in Mumbai